The following is a list of the 21 cantons of the Guadeloupe department, in France, following the French canton reorganisation which came into effect in March of 2015:

 Les Abymes-1
 Les Abymes-2
 Les Abymes-3
 Baie-Mahault-1
 Baie-Mahault-2
 Basse-Terre
 Capesterre-Belle-Eau
 Le Gosier
 Lamentin
 Marie-Galante
 Morne-à-l'Eau
 Le Moule
 Petit-Bourg
 Petit-Canal
 Pointe-à-Pitre
 Sainte-Anne
 Sainte-Rose-1
 Sainte-Rose-2
 Saint-François
 Trois-Rivières
 Vieux-Habitants

Saint-Martin-Saint-Barthélemy 
The arrondissement of Saint-Martin-Saint-Barthélemy was part of the department of Guadeloupe until 22 February 2007, when the communes of Saint-Martin and Saint-Barthélemy were detached from Guadeloupe. It was made up of three cantons:
 Saint-Barthélemy
 Saint-Martin 1st Canton
 Saint-Martin 2nd Canton

This arrondissement and these cantons ceased to exist on 22 February 2007.

References

 
Guadeloupe 2